Iron(III) iodide is an inorganic compound with the chemical formula FeI3. It is a thermodynamically unstable compound that is difficult to prepare. Nevertheless, iron(III) iodide has been synthesised in small quantities in the absence of air and water.

Preparation 
Iron(III) and iodide tend to undergo a redox reaction in which Fe3+ is reduced to Fe2+ and I− is oxidised to I2. This reaction can be avoided and iron(III) iodide can be synthesised by a photochemical reaction. Iron pentacarbonyl reacts with excess iodine in hexane under argon, releasing carbon monoxide and forming the complex diiodotetracarbonyliron(II), Fe(CO)4I2, as a light red solution.

Fe(CO)5 + I2 → Fe(CO)4I2 + CO

This complex then undergoes oxidative photodecarbonylation at −20 °C in the presence of further iodine and actinic light. A black film of FeI3 is deposited as further carbon monoxide is evolved.

Fe(CO)4I2 + ½I2 + hν → FeI3 + 4CO

Reactivity 
Iron(III) iodide is  prone to light-induced decomposition to iron(II) iodide and iodine.

FeI3 + hν → FeI2 + ½I2

Donor solvents such as tetrahydrofuran, acetonitrile, pyridine and water also promote this reaction: iron(III) iodide is extremely hygroscopic. It is sparingly soluble in dichloromethane. It reacts with iodide to form the tetraiodoferrate(III) ion.
FeI3 + I− → FeI4−

Iron(III) iodide undergoes ligand exchange or metathesis with certain alkyl chlorides to reversibly form iron(III) chloride and the corresponding alkyl iodides.

FeI3 + 3 RCl ⇌ FeCl3 + 3 RI

Adducts of FeI3 are well known.  An orange complex can be prepared from FeI2 and I2 in the presence of thiourea. Iron powder reacts with iodine-containing proligands to also give adducts of ferric iodide.

See also 
 Iron(II) iodide, FeI2

References 

Iron(III) compounds
Iodides